The Australian Melanoma Research Foundation participates in various activities to raise funds and raise awareness of melanoma.

References

Cancer organisations based in Australia
Health charities in Australia
Medical and health organisations based in South Australia